Thunder Creek may refer to:

 Thunder Creek (1912–1938 electoral district), of the provincial legislature of Saskatchewan, Canada
 Thunder Creek (1975–2016 electoral district), of the provincial legislature of Saskatchewan, Canada
 Thunder Creek (Washington), a stream in North Cascades National Park, Washington state, US
 Thunder Creek (Saskatchewan), a river in southern Saskatchewan